Kenneth Nichols O'Keefe (born July 21, 1969) is an American-Irish-Palestinian citizen and activist and former United States marine and Gulf War veteran. In 2001, he set fire to his United States passport. Subsequently, he led the human shield action to Iraq and was a passenger on the MV Mavi Marmara during the Gaza flotilla raid, where he disarmed two of the Israeli commandos who boarded the ship, initiating a confrontation in which ten Turkish activists were killed.

According to the Southern Poverty Law Center O'Keefe gives speeches to white supremacist groups and endorses David Duke.

Military background
O'Keefe served as a United States marine in the First Gulf War. According to his own website, he was discharged because he "spoke out openly about abuse of power by my 'superiors' and as a consequence I paid a heavy price. I realised that honour and integrity were virtues which are often punished rather than rewarded and the Marines supplied me with my first serious taste of injustice."

Marine conservation
O'Keefe created a marine conservation social enterprise "to protect and defend the marine environment" in Hawaii in 1996. This enterprise conducted ghost net recoveries and rescues of endangered green sea turtle wrapped in monofilament fishing line. O'Keefe became a pioneer in sea turtle rescues in Hawaii and led a campaign to create a marine sanctuary (Pupukea MLCD) on the North Shore of Oahu.

In 1998 he joined an anti-whaling campaign in which he was bloodied when attempting to retrieve a boat belonging to the Sea Shepherd Conservation Society, of which he was a crew member. At this time he was being mentored by Paul Watson. Eventually he served as the regional director for the Sea Shepherd Conservation Society, in Hawaii.

Human shield action to Iraq
In December 2002, O'Keefe started the human shield action to Iraq group. Intended to "make it politically impossible for them to bomb" Iraq by placing western civilians as "shields" at non-military locations, about 75 activists traveled over land from London to Baghdad in two double-decker buses. Critics of the human shields argued that their mission would only protect Saddam Hussein. O'Keefe argued the "people of Iraq" would suffer the most from a war and publicly acknowledged Hussein as a "violent dictator". At its height about 300 human shields were in Baghdad, but due to challenges internally, with the Iraqi dictatorship and O'Keefe's deportation from Iraq, the numbers dwindled.

Citizenship
O'Keefe attempted formal renunciation of his U.S. citizenship in 2001, but

O'Keefe has tried officially to renounce his citizenship three times without success, first in Vancouver [Canada] and then in the Netherlands. He then tried again in Baghdad, Iraq. His initial bid was rejected after the State Department concluded that he would return to the United States — a credible inference, as O'Keefe in fact had returned immediately. After his second attempt, he waited seven months with no response before he tried a more sensational approach. He went back to the consulate at The Hague, retrieved his passport, walked outside, and lit it on fire. Seventeen days later, he received a letter from the State Department informing him that he was still an American, because he had not obtained the right to reside elsewhere. He had succeeded only in breaking the law, since mutilating a passport is illegal. It says so right on the passport.

Gaza Flotilla involvement
In June 2010, O'Keefe was aboard the MV Mavi Marmara. During the Gaza flotilla raid, he was one of the passengers who disarmed IDF commandos boarding the ship. According to O'Keefe, he disarmed one from the 9mm pistol he was carrying, removing its bullets before hiding the pistol with the intention to keep it as evidence of the Israeli action against the ship. O'Keefe said he subsequently helped disarm another of the ship's IDF soldiers, by prising the commando's fingers from the rifle he was holding.

O'Keefe said of the experience that it was like "combat but without combat weapons". He said, "We had in our full possession, three completely disarmed and helpless commandos" who were "surrounded by at least 100 men ... [W]e could have done anything with them", adding that "woman provided basic first aid, and ultimately they were released, battered and bruised for sure, but alive. Able to live another day."

According to Greta Berlin, spokesperson for the Free Gaza Movement who was involved in the flotilla, O'Keefe "was responsible for some of the deaths on board the Mavi Marmara. Had he not disarmed an Israeli terrorist soldier, they would not have started to fire."

O'Keefe was among those arrested and detained in Israel, where he (according to himself and another activist) was beaten at Tel Aviv airport when he resisted deportation while still in Israeli custody. He claims a policeman hit him on the head with a truncheon and that he was choked until he almost blacked out. He said he spent two more days in a detention facility in the airport after the incident. O'Keefe said the Irish consul general tried to convince him to agree to leave and asked him to wash the blood off his face but he refused.

A video showing his bloodied face was released upon his arrival in Istanbul. On June 6, 2010, the Israel Defense Forces (IDF) charged that O'Keefe is an "anti-Israel extremist" and "operative of the Hamas Terror organization". According to the IDF he was entering the Gaza Strip in order to "form and train a commando unit for the Palestinian terror organization." He responded: "If they had a supposed terrorist in their possession, why the hell did they let me go?" He acknowledged having had meetings with Prime Minister Ismail Haniyeh and other senior Hamas officials.

Road to Hope
In October 2010, O'Keefe joined the "Road to Hope", a humanitarian aid convoy to Gaza. Organizers were seeking to transport the convoy from the port of Derna, Libya to el-Arish, Egypt on board the private-charter roll-on/roll-off ferry M.V. Strofades IV, which left port unexpectedly without any of the aid after the ship's owners and captain got into an argument with the aid workers, although seven Libyan port officials and ten of the Road to Hope team were on board.

Organisers of the convoy claimed that despite paying a shipping agent for the charter of the ship, O'Keefe and the others were "kidnapped" from the port by the owner and the captain of the ship who "went nuts". The ship owners claimed that the activists had boarded the ship without any contract or charter. Due to a "tense atmosphere" aboard the ship, and (as he claimed) receiving no response from the Libyan authorities, the captain feared for the safety of the ship and decided to sail out of Libyan waters.

The ship eventually docked at Piraeus, Greece after being boarded by Greek commandos. All the activists were allowed to disembark after it was determined they had committed no crimes.

The People's Voice
In September 2013 O'Keefe joined David Icke in the team of The People's Voice, an internet TV station. In particular, he is presenting The Middle East Show, reporting news and comments on the subjects related to Middle east politics.

David Duke 
O'Keefe has formed a close association with David Duke. According to the southern Poverty Law Center, "O'Keefe appeared on Duke's radio show in February 2013, where the pair discussed, according to Duke, "the International Conference on Hollywoodism to which he has been invited by Hamed Ghashghavi. It exposes the Zio control of Hollywood which not only promotes lies about the enemies of Jewish extremism, but literally poisons the hearts and minds of hundreds of millions of people in West and all over the world."

Political views

On Iran's Press TV program, The Agenda, while speaking on the topic of "America: Is it a Civilized Nation?", O'Keefe denied the plausibility that the September 11 attacks were committed by Osama bin Laden and the 19 hijackers. He claimed it was an inside job and that the US government and intelligence agencies, including Mossad, were responsible. He has repeated this view in an article on his own website, in which he states "Israeli Mossad worked with high treason traitors in the US government to set explosives in the twin towers and building 7 on 9/11 so as to instigate the fraudulent 'War on Terror'".

O'Keefe appeared, alongside British politician Jenny Tonge at an Israeli Apartheid Week talk at Middlesex University on February 23, 2012, during which he stated, "Israel and Mossad were directly involved in 9/11" and that it "continues to foster false flag terrorism ... [Israel] has no place in this world. And it must in its current form, if you want me to use some inflammatory language, in its current form should be destroyed". A heated debate with supporters of Israel, who included Zionist Federation co-vice-chairman Jonathan Hoffman, followed O'Keefe's speech.

The police later reviewed remarks made by O'Keefe at the meeting after allegations were made by two pro-Israel activists who had been in the audience that they had incited racial hatred by comparing Jewish audience members to Nazis (O'Keefe had said: "The Jewish state is acting on behalf of the Jewish people. You [the Jewish people], like the Nazis, now have a special obligation. The decent Germans of World War Two, what did they do when the Nazis came to power and instituted their policies? Did they do enough to stop the Nazis? No, they didn't. What are the Jewish people doing right now? Are you doing enough to stop your racist, apartheid, genocidal state?"). After looking at submitted video and media material, the police came to the opinion that no criminal offences had been committed and no further action was taken.

Six student societies in the Palestine solidarity movement released a statement condemning O'Keefe's remarks as anti-Semitic, stating that such opinions had no place in their struggle "against all forms of racism". However, Middlesex University's Student Union awarded the Free Palestine Society for O'Keefe's speaking event with the 'best society event of the year'.

References

External links
 World Citizen Ken O'Keefe official website
 

1969 births
Living people
American anti-war activists
Irish anti-war activists
Naturalized citizens of the State of Palestine
American people of Irish descent
Irish people of American descent
9/11 conspiracy theorists
American tax resisters
Anti-Zionism in the United States
American conspiracy theorists
American white supremacists